Berg is a hamlet in the Dutch province of Limburg. It is located in the municipality of Peel en Maas, about 2 km west of the center of that village.

Berg has no place name signs and consists of about 40 houses.

References

Populated places in Limburg (Netherlands)
Peel en Maas